Sindoora Sandhyakku Mounam is a 1982 Indian Malayalam film directed by I. V. Sasi and written by Priyadarshan based the Hollywood title Psych-Out. The film stars Lakhsmi, Madhavi, Ratheesh, Mohanlal, Kuthiravattom Pappu and Prathap Pothen.  The whole film is set in the city of Kathmandu.

Cast
 Ratheesh as Vinod
 Mohanlal as Kishor
 Kuthiravattom Pappu as Chandran
 Prathap Pothen as Anil aka Raju
 Balan K. Nair as Sekhar
 Ravindran as Kumar
 Kunchan as Prem Anand
 Lakhsmi as Deepthi
 Madhavi as Siji
 Surekha  as Kumar's fiancée
 Sathyakala as Deepthi's Mother
 Sathyachitra as Deepthi's step mother
 Jaffer Khan
 Jayanthi
 Mammootty as Deepthi's father (cameo)
 Seema as Seema (cameo)

Plot
Deepthi and Raju, who are siblings lives separately after their parents divorced. However, Deepthi faces many challenges when she goes in search of Raju after many years.

Soundtrack
The music was composed by Shyam and the lyrics were written by Bichu Thirumala.

Trivia
This was one of the first screenplays of Priyadarshan,  based on the American title Psych-Out. But only after release, he realized that someone else was credited for his work. Earlier, Psych-Out was remade in Hindi by Devanand, entitled Hare Rama Hare Krishna. it's not first time he faced such a bitter experience. Earlier that year he drafted Kadathu, which was directed by P. G. Viswambharan. When the movie screened in the theratre he noticed credit had gone to the director himself.

References

External links

view the film
 

1980s Malayalam-language films
Films directed by I. V. Sasi